Ceratopteris is the only genus among homosporous ferns that is exclusively aquatic. It is pan-tropical and classified in the Parkerioideae subfamily of the family Pteridaceae.

Description

Erect aquatic or subaquatic ferns of moderate size. Rhizome short, fleshy, horizontal and ascending to erect, loosely rooted in the mud or +/- floating, radial, dictyostelic with numerous meristeles and medullary strands, young parts bearing thin, ovate, +/- cordate, clathrate scales. Fronds stipitate, the stipes fleshy, with numerous longitudinal air canals, abaxially rounded and ribbed, adaxially flattened, vascular bundles in a peripheral ring, one with each rib and several to the adaxial side, and several smaller medullary strands; lamina dimorphic, sterile fronds +/- spreading, 2–3-pinnatifid with broad membranous lobes, venation reticulate without included free veinlets, often with proliferous buds in the axils; fertile fronds erect, longer, narrower and more divided than the sterile, the lobes strongly recurved to completely cover the adiaxial surface, venation longitudinal, branching at the bases of the lobes. Sporangia solititary, scattered along the veins, exindusiate but protected by the continuous reflexed margin of the lamina, large, short-stalked, annulus broad, irregular, of 30–70 thickened cells, or lacking, containing 16 to 32 spores. Spores large, trilete, ribbed with irregular long meshes.

Taxonomy 
Ceratopteris was long placed in the monogeneric family Parkeriaceae, thought to be unique because of its aquatic adaptations.  However, recent genetic analysis has shown it to be clearly allied with Acrostichum in the subfamily  Parkerioideae, within the family Pteridaceae.

Species 
At one time, some authorities recognized only one species; now some authorities recognize only four species.  However, recent work by Masuyama and Watano   has suggested that C. thalictroides actually consists of four cryptic species (thalictroides, froesii, gaudichaudii, oblongibloba).

Ceratopteris cornuta (P. Beauv.) Le Prieur; Ann. Sci. Nat. 19: 103. t. 4A (1830)
Ceratopteris froesii Brade, Arch. Jard. Bot. Rio de Janeiro 18: 31 (1964).
Ceratopteris gaudichaudii Brongn.; Bull. Soc. Philom. 187 (1821)
Ceratopteris oblongiloba Masuyama & Watano—Acta Phytotax. Geobot. 61(2): 84 (-85; figs. 3-4). 2010 [Nov 2010] 
Ceratopteris pteridoides (Hook.) Hieron.; Bot. Jahrb. Syst. 34: 561 (1905)
Ceratopteris richardii Brongn.; Dict. Class. Hist. Nat. 3: 351 (1823) - "C-fern"
Ceratopteris thalictroides (L.) Brongn.; Bull. Sci. Soc. Philom. Paris, sér. 3, 8: 186 (1821)

Distribution and habitat 

This widespread genus of four to six species inhabits the humid tropics.

Ceratopteris is also important in the study of pteridophytes and is a commonly used model organism for use in genomic studies, due to the ease and rapidity with which it can be grown in laboratories, as well as having well-characterized phenotypes. Patented strains of this plant have been developed.

Outcrossing and self-fertilization

A gametophyte is one of the two alternating multicellular phases of the fern life cycle. The gametophyte is haploid.  The other stage is the diploid sporophyte.  A gametophyte is a multicellular organism that develops from a haploid spore (that has one set of chromosomes).  Ceratopteris thalictroides has two types of gametophytes with different sexual expression: these types are hermaphrodite and male.  Hermaphroditic gametophytes have one or several archegonia and a few antheridia.  Archegonia are multicellular structures of the gametophyte that produce and contain the ovum or female gamete.  The corresponding male organ is the antheridium,  a haploid organ producing and containing sperm. The second of the two types of gametophyte are male that produce only antheridia.

When Ceratopteris richardii ferns are grown alone they develop into hermaphrodites (with mainly female archegonia).  However, plants that grow near established genetically identical individuals develop into males.  The hermaphrodite secretes a pheromone (antheridiogen) that tells others nearby to be male.  Thus when plants are near each other outcrossing is promoted.  Self-fertilization predominates when there is no nearby partner.

Toxicity
The plants may have carcinogenic properties.

Uses
Ceratopteris is a fairly popular aquarium plant, often sold under the name "water sprite."  It may be grown as an emersed but natant (floating) plant, or as an immersed plant rooted in the substrate. Under the right conditions the plants will grow fully emerse erect leaves. Under a bright light the plants can grow fast, and be used to help cycle an aquarium.

This plant is often used as a vegetable, particularly in Asia.

References

Further reading
Benedict, R.C. 1909. The genus Ceratopteris: a preliminary revision. Bull. Torrey Bot. Club 36: 463-476.
Copeland, E.B. 1942. Edible ferns. Amer. Fern J. 32: 121 - 126, pl.
Donsellar, J. van 1969. On the distribution and ecology of Ceratopteris in Surinam. Amer. Fern J. 59: 3 - 8.
Fosberg, F.R. 1958. Notes on Micronesian Pteridophyta, II. Amer. Fern J. 48: 35 - 39. (Ceratopteris)
Johns, R.J. & Bellamy, A. 1979. Ferns and fern allies of Papua New Guinea. P.N.G. Office of Forests. (incl. Parkeriaceae)
Johnson, A. 1961. The genus Ceratopteris in Malaya. Gard. Bull. Sing. 18: 76 - 81.
Lloyd, R.M. 1972. Species delimitation in the genus Ceratopteris (Parkeriaceae). Am. J. Bot. 59: 676.
Lloyd, R.M. 1973. Sexual and vegetative reproduction in Hawaiian Ceratopteris thalictroides. Amer. Fern J. 63: 12 - 18.
Lloyd, R.M. 1974. Systematics of the genus Ceratopteris Brongn. (Parkeriaceae) II. Taxonomy. Brittonia 26: 139 - 160, f. 1 - 9.

Pteridaceae
Aquatic plants
Fern genera
Taxa named by Adolphe-Théodore Brongniart